The Statutes of the Realm is an authoritative collection of Acts of the Parliament of England from the earliest times to the Union of the Parliaments in 1707, and Acts of the Parliament of Great Britain passed up to the death of Queen Anne in 1714.  It was published between 1810 and 1825 by the Record Commission as a series of 9 volumes, with volume IV split into two separately bound parts, together with volumes containing an Alphabetical Index and a Chronological Index.

The collection contains all Acts included in all earlier printed collections, together with a number of Acts and translations which had not previously been printed.  Also, in contrast with previous collections, the full text of each Act is printed regardless of whether it was still in force at the time of publication.  However, only the titles of Private Acts are printed from 1539 onwards.  The text of each Act is generally taken from the Statute Rolls, or later from its enrollment in Chancery, with missing text supplied from the original Acts preserved in the Records of Parliament and other sources.

The first volume is prefaced with a comprehensive introduction explaining how and why The Statutes of the Realm was prepared.  It also contains the text of various charters of liberties, from the reign of Henry I to that of Edward I of England.

The collection does not contain any Acts passed by the old Parliament of Scotland or the old Parliament of Ireland, nor does it contain the Ordinances and Acts passed without royal authority in the mid-seventeenth century.

Section 19(1)(b) of the Interpretation Act 1978 refers to The Statutes of the Realm.

For the purpose of citation, Statutes of the Realm may be abbreviated to Stat Realm.

List of volumes

See also
 Statutes at Large
 List of Acts of the Parliament of England
 List of Acts of the Parliament of Great Britain

References

External links
John Raithby, ed. The Statutes of the Realm. Complete set at Hathi Trust. This is the best and clearest digital set currently available of the original volumes, as reprinted in 1963 by Dawsons of Pall Mall, London. 
John Raithby, ed. The Statutes of the Realm. Volumes 5 (1628–80), 6 (1685–94) and 7 (1695-1701) from British History Online. This provides the most accurate text for vols 5–7, having been re-keyed manually from the originals, rather than relying on Optical Character Recognition of scanned pages.
John Raithby, ed. The Statutes of the Realm. Volume 3 and volume 4 part 1 and volume 5 from Google Books. 
John Raithby, ed. The Statutes of the Realm. Volume 4 part 1, Volume 4 part 2, Volume 6, Volume 7, Volume 8, Volume 9, Volume 10 and Volume 11 from the Internet Archive.
.

Legal literature
Acts of the Parliament of England
Acts of the Parliament of Great Britain